The 2022 FAS Tri-Nations Series was a three-team association football tournament held at the National Stadium in Kallang, Singapore between 23 and 29 March 2022 for the men's competition and at Jalan Besar Stadium between 4 and 11 April for the women's competition.

The men's tournament was organized by the Football Association of Singapore in conjunction with the Football Association of Malaysia and the Philippine Football Federation as part of the three team's precursor for the third round of the 2023 AFC Asian Cup qualification matches. The three games in the tournament are authorized by FIFA as International “A” Matches.

For the women's competition, Singapore hosted Seychelles and Papua New Guinea as part of Singapore's preparations for the 31st Southeast Asian Games Games.

Below are the squads for the 2022 FAS Tri-Nations Series, which takes place between  23 to 29 March 2022.

Men's team

Singapore
Head coach :  Nazri Nasir

Malaysia
Head coach :  Kim Pan-gon

Philippines
Head coach :  Stewart Hall (Interim)

Women's team

Singapore

Papua New Guinea

Seychelles

Statistics

Player representation by league system

Player representation by club 
Clubs with 2 or more players represented are listed.

Player representation by club confederation

References

FAS Tri-Nations Series